Guanyem les Illes Balears (Catalan for Let's Win the Balearic Islands, Guanyem) is an electoral alliance formed by United Left of the Balearic Islands and Building the Left–Socialist Alternative to contest the 2015 Balearic regional election. Both parties also contested, together with Podemos, the 2015 Ibiza Island Council election.

Member parties
 United Left of the Balearic Islands (EUIB)
 Building the Left–Socialist Alternative (CLI–AS)

References

Federations of United Left (Spain)
Political parties in the Balearic Islands
Political parties established in 2015
Political party alliances in Spain